The 1927 Cornell Big Red football team was an American football team that represented Cornell University during the 1927 college football season.  In their eighth season under head coach Gil Dobie, the Big Red compiled a 3–3–2 record and outscored all opponents by a combined total of 136 to 121.

Schedule

References

Cornell
Cornell Big Red football seasons
Cornell Big Red football